Choi Woo-hyuk (born May 4, 1997) is a South Korean actor. He began his career as a child actor, notably in the film Bunt (2007).

Filmography

Film

Television series

Awards and nominations

References

External links 
 
 
 

1997 births
Living people
South Korean male child actors
South Korean male television actors
South Korean male film actors